St. John's basketball may refer to:
St. John's NBLC team, Canadian professional team
St. John's Red Storm men's basketball, American college men's team
St. John's Red Storm women's basketball, American college women's team